is an anonymous abecedarian Latin hymn on the Day of Judgement. Since it is mentioned by Bede, it is believed to date to the 7th century or earlier.

It was translated into English by John Mason Neale as "That great Day of wrath and terror" in his collection Mediaeval Hymns and Sequences (3rd ed. 1867).

The hymn is composed in the trochaic septenarius metre, and is praised by Bede as a good example of a trochaic hymn in the rhythmic (accentual) style.

In its imagery of the Day of Judgement, the hymn draws mainly on Matthew chapter 25 and on the Book of Revelation.

References

Latin-language Christian hymns
Christian eschatology